Tithraustes deiphon is a moth of the family Notodontidae first described by Herbert Druce in 1885. It is found in Panama and Costa Rica.

References

Moths described in 1885
Notodontidae of South America